Max Liebling House is a Bauhaus-style modernist building in Tel Aviv, Israel. Located at 29 Idelson Street, it was designed by architect Dov Karmi and built by Tony and Max Liebling in 1936.

History
Max Leibling house was the first building in the country to use elongated recessed balconies, an adaptation of Le Corbusier's strip windows. Horizontality is emphasized by the narrow intervals between the building's parapet and overhang; not only does this have the design impact of  emphasizing the horizontal style, it has the practical effect of screening out the heat of the Mediterranean sun. The timbered pergola, a design element frequently seen in Jerusalem, is unusual in Tel Aviv.

In 2014 Max Liebling House was one of the first ten modernist buildings to receive restoration grants under the Getty Foundation's new "Keeping It Modern" initiative.

In 2015 the German government funded the restoration of the House as a museum that would also oversee the restoration and preservation of Tel Aviv's notable Bauhaus buildings.  Tel Aviv's White City district, a designate World Heritage Site, is the largest collection of German Bauhaus-style buildings found anywhere in the world.

See also 
Bauhaus Center, Tel Aviv 
Bauhaus Museum, Tel Aviv 
Architecture of Israel

References

External links

Sprechender Zeitzeuge - White City Center in Tel Aviv report on the White City Center, an information center in the Max Liebling house (report is in German language)

 01
 01
Landmarks in Tel Aviv
Bauhaus
International Style (architecture)
Houses completed in 1936